This article contains a list of named passenger trains in the United States, with names beginning N through R.

N

O

P

Q

R

References

North America (N-R)
 N-R
Named passenger trains